Gyalecta is a genus of fungi in the family Gyalectaceae that contains 50 species. Gyalecta was circumscribed by lichenologist Erik Acharius in 1808.

Selected species
Gyalecta ancistrospora 
Gyalecta arbuti 
Gyalecta azorellae 
Gyalecta bicellulata 
Gyalecta biformis 
Gyalecta calcicola 
Gyalecta caudata 
Gyalecta caudiospora 
Gyalecta coralloidea 
Gyalecta derivata 
Gyalecta flotovii 
Gyalecta foveolaris 
Gyalecta geoica 
Gyalecta gyalizella 
Gyalecta herculina 
Gyalecta himalayensis 
Gyalecta hokkaidica 
Gyalecta incarnata 
Gyalecta jenensis 
Gyalecta kibiensis 
Gyalecta lumbrispora 
Gyalecta lyngei 
Gyalecta mediterranea 
Gyalecta nidarosiensis 
Gyalecta nigritella 
Gyalecta obesispora 
Gyalecta ophiospora 
Gyalecta pellucida 
Gyalecta pittieriana 
Gyalecta russula 
Gyalecta saxatilis 
Gyalecta stellaris 
Gyalecta titovii 
Gyalecta truncigena 
Gyalecta ulleungdoensis 
Gyalecta ulmi 
Gyalecta uncinata 
Gyalecta vezdana

Gallery

References

Gyalectales
Gyalectales genera
Lichen genera
Taxa named by Erik Acharius
Taxa described in 1808